Climate change in Luxembourg discusses the climate change issues in Luxembourg.

Greenhouse gas emissions

Emissions of carbon dioxide in total, per capita in 2007 were 22.4 tons CO2 compared to the European Union's 27 countries average of 7.9 tons per capita. 1990 emissions were 13 Mt CO2eq

The Kyoto protocol target is reduction of 4 Mt (28%).

Energy use 
The European primary energy use per capita was highest in 2008 in (TWh/per million): 1) Iceland 191 2) Luxembourg 98 3) Finland 77 4) Norway 72 5) Belgium  64 6) Sweden  62 7) Netherlands  56 8) Russia 56 9) Kazakhstan 53 10)  Czech Republic 50 11) France  48, 12) Germany  47 13) Estonia 47 and 14) Austria 46.

Mitigation and adaptation

Policies and legislation 
Luxembourg is a member of the EU and thus the EU directives are binding.

Paris Agreement

The Paris agreement is a legally international agreement, its main goal is to limit global warming to below 1.5 degrees Celsius, compared to pre-industrial levels. The Nationally Determined Contributions (NDC's) are the plans to fight climate change adapted for each country. Every party in the agreement has different targets based on its own historical climate records and country's circumstances and all the targets for each country are stated in their NDC. In the case of member countries of the European Union the goals are very similar and the European Union work with a common strategy within the Paris agreement.

Recent temperature extremes in Luxembourg that are possibly caused by climate change

2022 
On 19 July 2022, the temperature reached 36.3°C in Luxembourg City.

2019 
On 25 July 2019, the 2003 temperature record was broken in Steinsel when it reached 40.8°C.

2003 
On 8 August & 12 August 2003, the temperature reached 37.9°C at Findel airport.

See also
 Plug-in electric vehicles in Luxembourg

References

 
Luxembourg